The 2014 Düsseldorf Open was a men's tennis tournament played on clay courts. It was the second edition of the Düsseldorf Open as an ATP World Tour 250 series event on the 2014 ATP World Tour. It took place at the Rochusclub in Düsseldorf, Germany, from May 18 through May 24, 2014.

Points and prize money

Point distribution

Prize money 

* per team

Singles main-draw entrants

Seeds 

 Rankings are as of May 12, 2014.

Other entrants 
The following players received wildcards into the singles main draw:
  Dustin Brown
  Tobias Kamke
  Nikola Milojević

The following players received entry from the qualifying draw:
  Mirza Bašić
  Mate Delić
  Alessandro Giannessi
  Jason Kubler

Withdrawals 
Before the tournament
  Alejandro Falla
  Bradley Klahn

Doubles main-draw entrants

Seeds 

 Rankings are as of May 12, 2014.

Other entrants 
The following pairs received wildcards into the doubles main draw:
  Facundo Argüello /  Manuel Peña López
  Dušan Lajović /  Lu Yen-hsun

Champions

Singles 

 Philipp Kohlschreiber def.  Ivo Karlović, 6–2, 7–6(7–4)

Doubles 

 Santiago González /  Scott Lipsky def.  Martin Emmrich /  Christopher Kas, 7–5, 4–6, [10–3]

References

External links 
 Official website

Dusseldorf Open
Düsseldorf Open (ATP Tour)
2014 in German tennis
2010s in Düsseldorf